Montherlant is a former commune in the Oise department in northern France. It joined the commune of Saint-Crépin-Ibouvillers in January 2015.

See also
 Communes of the Oise department

References

Former communes of Oise
Populated places disestablished in 2015